The Armed Forces of Haiti, consisted of the Haitian Army, Haitian Navy (at times), the Haitian Air Force, Haitian Coast Guard,  (ANI) and some police forces (Port-au-Prince Police). The Army was always the dominant service with the others serving primarily in a support role. The name of Haiti's military was changed from The Indigenous Army (French: Armée Indigène) to
the Garde d'Haiti after U.S. Invasion and Occupation of Haiti in 1915. Then to the Forces Armées d'Haïti—FAd'H in 1958 during the rule of François Duvalier. After years of military interference in politics, including dozens of military coups, Haiti disbanded its military in 1995.

On 17 November 2017, the armed forces were remobilized by President Jovenel Moise. The President suspended the previous executive orders by then President Jean-Bertrand Aristide who suspended and disbanded the armed forces on 6 December 1995.

History

Origins
The origins of Haiti's military lie in the Haitian Revolution. A decade of warfare produced a military cadre from which Haiti's early leaders emerged. Defeat of the French demonstrated Haiti's considerable strategic stamina and tactical capabilities, but Haiti's victory did not translate into a successful national government or a strong economy. Lacking a strong constitution, Haiti was usually ruled by force. The armed forces, who had been united against the French, fragmented into warring regional factions. The military very soon took control of almost every aspect of Haitian life. Officers assumed responsibility for the administration of justice and for municipal management. According to a Haitian diplomat, the country was in its earlier days "an immense military camp." Without viable civilian institutions, Haiti was vulnerable to military personalities, who permanently shaped the nation's authoritarian, personalist, and coercive style of governance.

19th century
Haiti's defense fell victim to political vagaries. A readiness for battle and the initiation of defense-related engineering projects in the early 19th century turned out to be costly preparation for conflict against phantom armies. The engineering projects included construction of the citadel of La Ferrière in northern Haiti. Soon afterward, Haiti turned its attention toward the rest of the island of Hispaniola (La Isla Española), which Haiti controlled between 1822 and 1844. Controlling the whole island, however, drained the national treasury and induced torpor in the battle-hardened veterans of the wars of independence.

During the mid-19th century, prolonged instability weakened the military. By the end of the 19th century, Haiti's military had become little more than an undisciplined, ill-fed, and poorly paid militia that shifted its allegiances as battles were won or lost and as new leaders came to power. Between 1806 and 1879, an estimated 69 revolts against existing governments took place; another twenty uprisings, or attempted insurrections, broke out between 1908 and 1915.

During the second half of the 19th century, the army either failed to protect the central government or directly caused the government's collapse. Rural insurgent movements led by piquets and cacos limited the central government's authority in outlying areas. These groups carried on war into the 20th century; they were finally put down by the United States Marine Corps in 1919.

At the beginning of the 20th century, Haiti's political instability provoked interference of the great powers (France, Germany, and the United States). The increasing American interest in Haiti prompted the United States Navy to deploy to the country's ports fifteen times between 1876 and 1913 in order to protect American lives and property, and the United States Marines to occupy the whole country from 1915 to 1934.

The Haitian Navy was created in 1860 with the commissioning of a single gunboat. Two additional gunboats entered service in 1875 followed by a corvette ten years later. By 1900 three British and French-built gunboats had been launched. In 1902 the Haitian gunboat Crête-à-Pierrot had a brief engagement with a German warship. The Admiral of the Haitian fleet, Hammerton Killick, scuttled his ship rather than surrender.

20th century

United States occupation

The United States Marines disbanded Haiti's army, which consisted of an estimated 9,000 men, including 308 generals. In February 1916, the Haitian Constabulary (Gendarmerie d'Haïti) was formed. United States Marines and United States Navy officers and non-commissioned officers (NCOs) commanded the group. The Gendarmerie attempted to secure public safety, initially by subduing the cacos; to promote development, particularly road construction; and to modernize the military through the introduction of a training structure, a health service, and other improvements.

The United States occupation of Haiti brought order and resulted in some economic and social development. At the same time, the United States overhauled Haiti's disintegrated military infrastructure. The Gendarmerie became the Garde d'Haïti in 1928; the Garde formed the core of Haiti's armed forces after the United States administration ended. The United States sought to establish a modern, apolitical military force in Haiti. On the surface, it succeeded; the organization, the training, and the equipment of the Garde all represented improvements over the military conditions existing before the occupation.

After the United States occupation ended, the Haitian military was given the responsibility to ensure domestic law and order. This concern with internal, rather than with external security, endured throughout the 20th century.

Post-occupation period 
The Haitian Coast Guard was created in the late 1930s. The Haitian Air Force was created in 1943.

Haiti became a party to a number of international agreements, including the Inter-American Treaty of Reciprocal Assistance (the Rio Treaty), the Charter of the Organization of American States, and the earlier Act of Chapultepec (1945). The nation's security concerns regarding neighboring Cuba and the Dominican Republic have been viewed since World War II within the broader framework of United States strategic interests in the Caribbean. The fact that the FAd'H deployed relatively few of its units along the Dominican border, despite a history of conflicts with its neighbor, reflects Haiti's limited national security concerns.

Duvalier period
After the establishment of the Duvalier regime in 1957, various external threats have had little impact on Haiti's security. The Duvaliers' tight control eliminated all Marxist influences in the country, thus minimizing the effects of the Cuban Revolution. It was not until 1986 that a communist party, the Unified Party of Haitian Communists (Parti Unifié Communiste Haïtien, PUCH), openly operated in the country. Cuba helped some Haitian refugees travel to Florida in the 1980s, but its overall interest in Haitian affairs has been unclear. The severity of Haiti's political and economic crises, along with the high profile of the United States in the region, has limited involvement by other countries in Haitian affairs.

Threats to Haiti's internal security, however, have been numerous during the past four decades. Between 1968 and 1970, the government repulsed three invasions supported by exiled Haitians. In 1970 the Coast Guard mutinied. The Coast Guard's five ships, low on fuel and ammunition, went into exile at the United States military base at Guantánamo, Cuba. In the early 1980s, Haitian military forces and members of the Volontaires de la Sécurité Nationale (VSN) defeated a small exile force on the Ile de la Tortue (Tortuga Island). An airplane dropped a bomb on the National Palace in 1982, and a car bomb exploded nearby in 1983. Exile groups, however, never posed a significant military challenge to the army and the VSN. The real challenge to these forces came in the popular domestic disturbances that developed after 1984.

Post-Duvalier period
After the collapse of the Duvalier regime in 1986, the FAd'H developed an agenda to exert national political leadership, to restore public order, and to gain control over the VSN and other paramilitary groups, but carrying out this program proved difficult, given Haiti's political, economic, and foreign policy situations.

The main mission of Haiti's armed forces in the late 1980s continued to be internal security. After 1986, however, this mission regularly conflicted with the national leadership role of the FAd'H. Generational and political differences among officers and a scarcity of resources for the military led to chronic instability that culminated in military coups. These coups caused the government to change hands four times in 1988. A fifth coup in early 1989, however, failed to topple the government. The two most important problems that the FAd'H had to face were, first, a divided senior military command and, second, suspicious junior officers and NCO personnel. These problems became apparent in 1988 when Avril ousted Namphy and subsequently dismissed a number of senior officers. The degree to which NCOs may have been manipulated in this process and the extent to which lower army echelons had begun to shape their own political attitudes caused some observers to doubt the military's future as an institution.

The challenges facing the FAd'H in the late 1980s were more political than military. The largest and most immediate questions revolved around the institution's ability to govern Haiti during a period of political transition and modernization. It remained unclear, in mid-1989, how and when the military planned to transfer power to a legitimate civilian government. Another important problem concerned the personal political ambitions of some army commanders. It was also unclear how the FAd'H would respond to these challenges because the institution had not demonstrated viable national political capabilities. The FAd'H was ill-prepared for this broad new role in national life because François Duvalier had severely limited its role in government affairs.

Other security-related problems included narcotics trafficking. United States officials have expressed concern over Haiti's role as a major transshipment area for narcotics, mainly Colombian cocaine bound for the United States. This role apparently expanded after Jean-Claude's fall. The United States Drug Enforcement Administration opened an office in Port-au- Prince in October 1987 to help Haitian authorities control drug trafficking; however, the lack of a professional police force in Haiti hindered these efforts. The FAd'H appeared ambivalent toward the narcotics issue because drug-related corruption reportedly involved hundreds of members of the officer corps and because some officers resented pressure from Washington. Avril, however, attempted to placate United States concerns by dismissing some officers linked to drug trafficking. The most prominent among the dismissed officers was Paul, a former commander of the Dessalines Battalion, who was indicted in March 1988 by a Florida grand jury on charges of cocaine distribution. Haiti had signed an extradition treaty with the United States, but the agreement did not cover narcotics-related offenses, so Paul never faced trial on the charges.

Paul's continued service in the army posed a political problem, and Avril asked him to retire. In November 1988, however, Paul died mysteriously, possibly a victim of poisoning. Paul's death removed a major narcotics figure and a potential threat to Avril's political power.

Unstable and unstructured civilian politics and institutions also undermined Haiti's stability. Some Duvalierists sought to use the armed forces completely or partially to restore the ancien régime. At the same time, more democracy-oriented civilian groups, all of which lacked strong institutional bases, continued to be suspicious of the army's political leadership. The weak economy and the international media's criticism of Haitian affairs resulted in financial and public-relations problems for the army; and, because Haiti's political environment remained volatile and because the army did not always appear to be in control of the country, Haiti faced more unrest and the possible development of insurgency movements. On the one hand, Haiti's armed forces was still one of the few institutions of national magnitude, but, on the other hand, the armed forces suffered from serious institutional deterioration and diminished cohesion. In 1989 the military was struggling to provide political leadership at a time when it faced its own disintegration.

Disbandment

After years of military interference in politics, including dozens of military coups (from two Duvalier-period attempts in 1958 and 1963 to the last one staged in 1991), Haiti disbanded its military in 1995. Haiti's National Assembly created new civilian law enforcement, with the heavily armed Haitian National Police, and the Haitian Coast Guard, with the help of the United States and the United Nations. Yet, to date there has been no official constitutional amendment to abolish the military. The United Nations Stabilization Mission in Haiti (MINUSTAH) has been authorized to complete the disarmament and demobilization of any remaining militias.

Without its own military, Haiti relies heavily on United Nations (UN) peacekeeping forces. The multinational force has been responsible for quelling riots and preparing for democratic elections. Before UN forces arrived, a multilateral force made up of troops from Canada, Chile, France, and the United States helped stabilize the country under the interim leadership of President Boniface Alexandre.

Haiti has no obvious external threats. Tensions have long existed between Haiti and the Dominican Republic, but the current border has been fixed since 1936.

21st century

Reformation

In 2017, it was announced that Haiti's government had launched a campaign to re-establish the army after MINUSTAH termination. According to the announcement, the government wanted to recruit about 500 men and women, between the ages of 18 and 25, who have passed their secondary education exams. The role of the army would be to help deal in times of natural disaster and to patrol Haitian borders.

Equipment

The army and air force were the better equipped branches of the armed forces, with the navy the least equipped over the years and up to 1994.

Aircraft

Many of Haiti's air force aircraft were donated second hand from the United States and France:

 North American Aviation F-51D Mustang fighters – 6 delivered 1950 and the last retired 1973/74, sold to Dominican Republic for parts
 North American Aviation T-28 Trojan fighter trainer – 12 ex-French Air Force delivered 1973
 Cessna O-2A Skymaster – 8 observation aircraft delivered 1975 and sold to Dominican Republic for parts
 Sikorsky S-55 utility helicopters
 Curtiss-Wright C-46 Commando transport
 de Havilland Mosquito light bomber – 8 ex-Royal Air Force delivered 1946
 de Havilland Canada DHC-2 Beaver/de Havilland Canada DHC-6 Twin Otter utility transport
 Hughes Helicopters 269C utility/trainer helicopter – 3
 Hughes Helicopters 369CC utility/trainer helicopter – 2
 Sikorsky S-58T (CH-34 ChoctawC)
 Aermacchi SF.260TP Warrior trainer
 Cessna 150 – 3/
 Cessna 172 Skyhawk trainer – 1
 Lockheed C-60 Lodestar 
 Boeing S-307 Stratoliner
 Cessna 310
 Douglas C-47 Dakota
 Beech 58 Baron
 Cessna 402 Utililiner
 IAI 201 Arava
 Piper PA-34 Seneca
 Cessna 303
 Beech 65 Queen Air
 Fairchild PT-19 trainer
 North American Aviation North American T-6G Texan trainer
 Vultee Aircraft Vultee BT-13A Valiant trainer
 Beech Bonanza F33 trainer
 SIAI-Machetti S-211 jet trainer, retired and put up for sale on 23 April 1990, 2 sold to United States Private companies and 2 to Republic of Singapore Air Force

After remobilization of Haitian Air Force by President Jovenel Moïse, Haitian Air Force will purchase military aircraft from Russia, China, Brazil and Israel in 2020 as part of an overall re-equipment plan.

Small Arms/Artillery/Armored vehicles
The equipment of the last standing army, most of it from the United States, was taken by the US Army in the 1990s during Operation Uphold Democracy:

 Cadillac-Gage V-100 Light Armoured Vehicle
 M1916 75 mm towed guns
 M101 105 mm towed howitzers
 M16 assault rifle
 Heckler & Koch G3 battle rifle
 Beretta M1951 pistol
 Uzi sub-machine gun

After remobilization of Haitian Army by President Jovenel Moïse, Haitian Army will purchase military ground vehicles from Russia, China, Brazil, South Korea, and Israel in 2019 as part of an overall re-equipment plan.

Naval fleet
The Haitian naval fleet existed in the early 20th century and later 20th century. Mostly a riverine navy, the navy was overpowered by the United States Navy in the early 20th century.
 Ex Italian cruiser  (1910–1911) renamed Consul Gostrück
 frigate Améthyste (1809–?)
 gunboat  (1896–1902)
 gunboat Croyant (1903–1908)
 gunboat Centenaire (1904–1911?)
 gunboat Vertières (1908–1915)
 gunboat Pacifique
 gunboat Liberté (1910–1911)
 260-ton steel gunboat
 iron corvette
 Two armed sloops

The ships (mainly cruisers) from the fleet that existed in the 1980s was handed over to the Haitian Coast Guard following the disbandment of the military.

After remobilization of the Haitian Navy by President Jovenel Moïse, the Haitian Navy will purchase military ships from Russia, China, and South Korea in 2022 as part of an overall re-equipment plan.

Functions of the Army 

 Maintain the national borders
 Establish doctrines for the various operations it has to undertake 
 Participate in military mobilization programs
 And actively achieve readiness to develop technologies and scientifical advances for the advancement of national defense

Current forces

Haitian Army

Army training 

Battle of Vertières Parade

Haitian National Police

The Haitian National Police is tasked with providing law enforcement and security for Haiti. The force currently numbers more than 8,500 police officers, and is expected to reach 14,000. The force consists of the General and Administrative Services, the Administrative Police, the Judicial Police, the SWAT team, and the Presidential Protection Unit. The Police also has several paramilitary units for defense.

The Haitian police uses the following weapons:
 IMI Galil
 IWI Tavor X95
 IWI ACE
 IWI Negev
 R4 assault rifle
 M16 rifle
 M4 Carbine
 FN SCAR
 Browning M2
 Benelli M4
 Heckler & Koch MP5

Haitian Coast Guard

The Haitian Coast Guard is charged with law enforcement, security, and search and rescue operations. It maintains bases in Port-au-Prince, Cap-Haïtien, and Jacmel. It is led by the Commandant of the Coast Guard, an Assistant Commandant, an Operations Manager, and a Head of Administration. The force currently has 19 vessels. Officially, it is a part of the Haitian National police.

Military related statistics
 Manpower available for military service: 2,047,083 males age 16–49, 2,047,953 females age 16–49 (2008 estimate)
 Manpower fit for military service: 1,303,743 males age 16–49, 1,332,316 females age 16–49 (2008 estimate)
 Manpower reaching militarily significant age annually: 105,655 males, 104,376 females (2008 estimate)
 Military expenditures: 0.4% of GDP in 2006

Foreign military forces
In June 2005, the United Nations Security Council authorized a reinforcement of the UN Stabilization Mission in Haiti (MINUSTAH)—from 6,700 troops and 1,600 civilian police to 7,500 troops and 1,900 civilian police—to provide security during the run-up to national elections in February 2006. On June 6, 2005, the UN military force launched a coordinated series of operations against armed gangs in Port-au-Prince. By February 2006, 21 nations had contributed military personnel, and 31 nations had contributed police personnel to MINUSTAH. Brazil was the largest single contributor of military personnel with 1,200 troops. From February to May 2005, the U.S. Southern Command carried out a humanitarian mission in Haiti entitled "New Horizons 2005." The task force built schools, drilled wells, provided preventative health services, and set up temporary housing for orphaned children. Troops from all branches of the U.S. armed forces participated.

See also
 Military history of Haiti
 List of commanders-in-chief of the Armed Forces of Haiti
 Tonton Macoute
 Gendarmerie of Haiti
 Defence Force of Haiti

References

External links and bibliography
 The US Navy in the Caribbean 1903–1920, Presence, prevention and persuasion – A Historical Analysis of Military Force Edward Rhodes, 2004 p 160–161
 Haitian Air Force
 

Christopher Langton, Military Balance 2007, Routledge

 
Coast Guard
Law enforcement agencies of Haiti